The Fly is an opera in two acts by Canadian composer Howard Shore, with a libretto by David Henry Hwang. It was commissioned by the Théâtre du Châtelet in Paris, France, where it premiered on 2 July 2008, and by Edgar Baitzel, then director of the Los Angeles Opera, where the opera was first performed on 7 September 2008. The work was broadcast by Radio France's station France Musique on 2 August 2008.

The opera is loosely based on David Cronenberg's 1986 film The Fly, which was based on the short story of the same name by George Langelaan. Shore also wrote the musically unrelated score of that film.

Roles

The opera runs approximately two hours.

References

External links

 (a review)

Compositions by Howard Shore
Science fiction operas
English-language operas
2008 operas
Operas based on films
Operas
The Fly (franchise)